Oman competed in the Olympic Games for the first time at the 1984 Summer Olympics in Los Angeles, United States.

Results by event

Athletics
Men's 200 metres
Mohamed Al-Hashimi
 Heat — 22.83 (→ did not advance)

Men's 400 metres
Mohammed Almaliki
 Heat — 47.61 (→ did not advance)

Men's 1,500 metres
 Amor Masoud Al-Sharjisay
 Qualifying Heat — 4:12.76 (→ did not advance)

Men's 3,000 metres steeplechase
 Abdullah Azzan Al-Akbary
 Qualifying Heat — 10:22.96 (→ did not advance)

Men's Marathon
 Awadh Shaban Al-Sameer — did not finish (→ no ranking)

References
Official Olympic Reports

Nations at the 1984 Summer Olympics
1984
1984 in Omani sport